Francisco Cabral (born 8 January 1997) is a Portuguese tennis player.

Cabral has a career high ATP singles ranking of world No. 862 achieved on 5 March 2018. He also has a career high doubles ranking of world No. 45 achieved on 12 September 2022.

Career

2021-2022: Record Six Challenger titles in a year, First ATP historic title & Top 100 debut
Cabral won eight ATP Challenger doubles titles with Nuno Borges, a record doubles of six in 2021, and one with Szymon Walków.

In May 2022, he reached the top 100 in doubles after a semifinal  and first ATP final showing at the 2022 Estoril Open with Borges as a wildcard pair, where they defeated the top seeded pair Jamie Murray and Michael Venus en route. They became the first Portuguese pair to reach and win the final at their home tournament on their ATP doubles debut.

ATP career finals

Doubles: 2 (2 titles)

Tour titles

Doubles

References

External links
 
 

1997 births
Living people
Portuguese male tennis players
Sportspeople from Porto
21st-century Portuguese people